Two for Physics is a Canadian science television series which aired on CBC Television in 1959.

Premise
This Toronto-produced series on scientific subjects concerned the realm of physics. It was hosted by Patterson Hume and Donald Ivey, professors with the University of Toronto who were previously featured on the local CBLT series Live And Learn.

Shows

Scheduling
This half-hour series was broadcast on Tuesdays at 10:30 p.m. from 7 July to 29 September 1959.

References

External links
 

CBC Television original programming
1959 Canadian television series debuts
1959 Canadian television series endings
Black-and-white Canadian television shows
Science education television series